The NWA Canadian Open Tag Team Championship was the top tag team professional wrestling championship in the Canadian promotion Maple Leaf Wrestling from 1952 through 1961. The title was then replaced with the Toronto version of the NWA International Tag Team Championship.

Title history

See also
Maple Leaf Wrestling

References

National Wrestling Alliance championships
Maple Leaf Wrestling championships
Tag team wrestling championships
Canadian professional wrestling championships